Europort may refer to

Ports and other logistics centres
 Wakefield Europort, Wakefield, West Yorkshire, UK
 Rosslare Europort, Rosslare Harbour, County Wexford, Ireland
 Thames Europort, Stone, Kent, UK
 Vatry Europort, Marne, France

Other
 Europort Avenue, Gibraltar
 Communauté de communes de l'Europort, former communauté de communes in Marne, France

Spelling variants
 Europoort - part of the Port of Rotterdam
 Europorte - A rail freight subsidiary of Eurotunnel
 Europorte 2 - A former rail freight subsidiary of Eurotunnel

Similar spellings
 Eurosport, television sports network